Ms Fisher's Modern Murder Mysteries (also stylised as Ms Fisher's MODern Murder Mysteries) is an Australian television drama series which began screening on the Seven Network on 21 February 2019. The series is a spin-off of the drama series Miss Fisher's Murder Mysteries, which was based on author Kerry Greenwood's series of Phryne Fisher detective novels.

Set in Melbourne in the mid-1960s, Ms Fisher's Modern Murder Mysteries revolves around the personal and professional life of Peregrine Fisher, daughter of Phryne’s half sister Annabelle (a result of an affair that Phryne’s father had), who inherits a fortune when the famous aunt she never knew goes missing over the highlands of New Guinea. Peregrine sets out to become a world-class private detective in her own right, guided by a group of exceptional women in The Adventuresses' Club, of which her aunt was also a member.

The series is produced by Beth Frey and directed by Fiona Banks, with Deb Cox, Samantha Winston, Chelsea Cassio and Jo Martino serving as writers for the series. Creators Fiona Eagger and Deb Cox also serve as executive producers.

A second season was commissioned by Acorn TV on 28 July 2020, which premiered on 7 June 2021 and concluded 19 July 2021.

Cast
 Geraldine Hakewill as Peregrine Fisher
 Joel Jackson as Detective James Steed
 Catherine McClements as Birdie Birnside
 James Mason as Eric Wild
 Toby Truslove as Samuel Birnside
 Louisa Mignone as Violetta Fellini
 Greg Stone as Chief Inspector Percy Sparrow
 Katie Robertson as Constable Fleur Connor
 Madeline Davies as Linda Wade
 Emma Hamilton as Sally Whedon

Episodes

Series 1 (2019)

For the UK broadcast, on the Drama channel commencing in January 2020, each episode was split into two parts.

Series 2 (2021)

References

External links 
 
 Every Cloud Productions

2019 Australian television series debuts
Australian television spin-offs
Australian drama television series
English-language television shows
Seven Network original programming
Television series set in the 1960s